Stephen Sewell Foster (born Sewell Foster) (November 22, 1792 – December 29, 1868) was a physician and political figure in Canada East.

He was born in Oakham, Massachusetts in 1792. He studied medicine, was licensed to practice in Vermont in 1815 and settled in Newfane there. In 1822, he moved to Frost Village near Waterloo in Lower Canada with his family. He was licensed to practice medicine in the province in 1830. He served as surgeon to a militia battalion and was also coroner for the Bedford District and a justice of the peace in Shefford County. Foster also was a founder and served as administrator for the Shefford Academy in Frost Village. In 1841, he was elected to represent Shefford in the Legislative Assembly of the Province of Canada and was reelected in 1844. He served as a governor of the College of Physicians and Surgeons of Lower Canada from 1847 to 1866. In 1857, he moved to Knowlton where he continued to practice medicine until his death in 1868.

His son Asa Belknap Foster also served as a member of the Legislative Assembly and was named to the Senate of Canada.

External links
 

1792 births
1868 deaths
People from Worcester County, Massachusetts
Members of the Legislative Assembly of the Province of Canada from Canada East
Physicians from Vermont
People from Windham County, Vermont
People from Montérégie
American emigrants to pre-Confederation Quebec
Anglophone Quebec people
Canadian coroners